Octad ('group of 8') or octade may refer to:

Octad (chord), octachord in music theory
Octad (computing), a group of 8 bits in computing
Octad (biology), an ascus containing eight ascospores

See also
 Heptad (disambiguation) ('group of 7')
 Ennead (disambiguation) ('group of 9')